Sukashitrochus atkinsoni is a species of minute sea snail, a marine gastropod mollusk or micromollusk in the family Scissurellidae, the little slit snails.

Description
The minute, brown shell attains a height of 2 mm. It has a globose-depressed shape. The spire is short, low, and blunt. The three whorls widen rapidly and are plane above. The last whorl descends very deeply toward the aperture, with a strong keel at the
shoulder, occupied by the anal fasciole, and another keel at the periphery, the space between them concave.  Below this carina there are about 3 rather
separated spiral lira, and around the umbilicus three more. The keels are obsolete for a short distance behind the aperture. The fine growth striae are scarcely perceptible. The slit fasciole present on the last 1½ whorls is very narrow. Its edgesare  pinched up into a strong keel. It terminates about ½ mm or ¾ mm behind the peristome in a long, narrow slot. The ovate aperture is very oblique. It is narrowed above. The columella is slightly arcuate, and nearly vertical. The umbilicus is narrowly perforated, funnel-shaped, and smooth inside. On old shells the median carina becomes rounded on the last ¾ whorl, and there are numerous spiral riblets both above and below the slit fasciole.

Distribution
This marine species occurs off Queensland to South Australia and Western Australia; off Tasmania.

References

External links
 To Encyclopedia of Life
 To World Register of Marine Species

Scissurellidae
Gastropods described in 1877